Roger Ingemar Ljung (born 8 January 1966) is a Swedish former professional footballer who played as a left back. He played for clubs in Sweden, Switzerland, Austria, Turkey, and Germany during a career that spanned between 1983 and 1995. He won 59 caps for the Sweden national team, and represented his country at the 1990 FIFA World Cup, UEFA Euro 1992, as well as the 1994 FIFA World Cup where Sweden finished third.

Club career
Born in Lomma, Scania, Ljung started his football career at the age of six, with lowly Lunds BK. In 1985, he was purchased by Malmö FF, being mostly used as a substitute in his early years and being on the roster as the club won five Allsvenskan championships in a row, with the player contributing regularly in the 1987 and 1988 editions.

In the summer of 1989, Ljung transferred to BSC Young Boys in Switzerland, moving in the following season to another side in the Swiss Super League, FC Zürich. He enjoyed his best individual years in Austria with FC Admira Wacker, scoring 26 Bundesliga goals in 67 games in his first two years combined, albeit without team silverware.

In 1994, after some months in Turkey with Galatasaray SK, Ljung signed with MSV Duisburg from Germany. After appearing in less of half of the games during the campaign and also suffering relegation from the Bundesliga, he decided to retire from football at only 29.

International career
Ljung played 59 international games for Sweden, scoring three goals. He was picked for the squad that appeared in the 1990 FIFA World Cup in Italy, playing only once in an eventual group stage exit.

Ljung was also selected for the team in UEFA Euro 1992, in Sweden played on home soil. His contribution to the final third-place was again minimal, as he only featured in the 2–3 semifinal loss against Germany.

In the 1994 World Cup in the United States, Ljung opened the national team's scoring account in a 2–2 group stage draw against Cameroon. This time, he was an undisputed first-choice – playing in six of seven games – and the country eventually finished third.

Ljung also participated in the 1988 Summer Olympics in Seoul, with Sweden ousted in the quarter-finals.

Post-retirement
After retiring from professional football in 1995, Ljung became a sports agent. He started his own agency in Lomma, Roger Ljung Promotion AB, being at the time one of only three licensed agents in the country; newspaper Aftonbladet considered him to be Sweden's most successful agent.

Ljung's most notable client was Freddie Ljungberg, who played several years in the Premier League. He brokered his deal with Arsenal for a £3 million transfer fee, and the pair parted ways in December 2006 when the player signed with mega-agency Creative Artists.

Other players Ljung worked for included Marcus Allbäck, Patrik Andersson, Erik Edman,
Andreas Isaksson, Kim Källström and Teddy Lucic.

Career statistics

International 

Scores and results list Sweden's goal tally first, score column indicates score after each Ljung goal.

References

External links
 
 
 
 

1966 births
Living people
People from Lomma Municipality
Swedish footballers
Association football defenders
Allsvenskan players
Lunds BK players
Malmö FF players
Swiss Super League players
BSC Young Boys players
FC Zürich players
Austrian Football Bundesliga players
FC Admira Wacker Mödling players
Süper Lig players
Galatasaray S.K. footballers
Bundesliga players
MSV Duisburg players
Sweden international footballers
1990 FIFA World Cup players
UEFA Euro 1992 players
1994 FIFA World Cup players
Sweden youth international footballers
Olympic footballers of Sweden
Footballers at the 1988 Summer Olympics
Swedish expatriate footballers
Expatriate footballers in Switzerland
Expatriate footballers in Austria
Expatriate footballers in Turkey
Expatriate footballers in Germany
Swedish expatriate sportspeople in Austria
Swedish expatriate sportspeople in Switzerland
Swedish expatriate sportspeople in Turkey
Swedish expatriate sportspeople in Germany
Swedish sports agents